Tonight is the 16th studio album by English singer-songwriter David Bowie, released on 24 September 1984 through EMI America Records. The follow-up to his most commercially successful album Let's Dance (1983), it was written and recorded in mid-1984 at Le Studio in Morin-Heights, Canada, following the conclusion of the Serious Moonlight Tour. The music on Tonight has been characterised as pop, blue-eyed soul, dance and rock. Much of the album's sound is the same as its predecessor's, due to Bowie's effort to retain the new audience that he had recently attracted, although some tracks contain R&B and reggae influences.

Bowie, Derek Bramble, and Hugh Padgham produced the album. Much of Bowie's creative process was the same as he used on Let's Dance. Many of the same personnel from Let's Dance and the Serious Moonlight tour returned for the Tonight sessions, with a few additions. Like its predecessor, Bowie played no instruments on Tonight, instead offering little creative input to the musicians during the sessions. Devoid of new ideas from touring, Bowie wrote only two new songs himself. Three songs, including the title track, were covers of Iggy Pop songs, who was present during most of the sessions and co-wrote multiple tracks. The title track is a duet with singer Tina Turner. The artwork, featuring Bowie blue-painted against an oil painting backdrop, was designed by Mick Haggerty.

Supported by the singles "Blue Jean", "Tonight" and "Loving the Alien", Tonight was a commercial success, reaching number one on the UK Albums Chart. However, it received mostly poor reviews from music critics, with most noting its lack of creativity. Following the critical dismissal of his next studio album Never Let Me Down (1987), Bowie would later express dissatisfaction with this period, calling Tonight not one of his stronger efforts, a sentiment echoed by later reviewers and Bowie's biographers. He did not tour to support the album and only performed "Loving the Alien" and "Blue Jean" on subsequent tours. The album was remastered in 2018 as part of the box set Loving the Alien (1983–1988).

Background and development
David Bowie released his 15th studio album Let's Dance in April 1983. It was a major commercial success, propelling Bowie to worldwide megastardom. He supported the album with his Serious Moonlight Tour from May to December 1983. Although it was hugely successful, Bowie later found the tour to be a mixed blessing, realising he no longer knew his audience. Because of the stress of the Serious Moonlight tour, Bowie found himself at a creative stalemate; he would later admit that touring always left him devoid of new ideas. At the conclusion of the tour, Bowie went on holiday in Bali and Java with his friend, singer Iggy Pop. Biographer Nicholas Pegg writes that until the success of Bowie's recording of "China Girl", Pop's fortunes had been dwindling since 1979 and he was forced to tour constantly. After holidaying together, Bowie was eager to work with Pop on his next record. Although Bowie felt he was ill-prepared to record a new album, pressure from the label to release a follow-up led him into the studio in the spring of 1984 unprepared.

Following the release of Let's Dance, Bowie said he wanted his next record to "go further"; he wanted to explore R&B, funk and reggae music. Bowie did not invite Nile Rodgers, the co-producer of Let's Dance, to work on the new record. Though initially surprised, Rodgers later attributed the decision to Bowie wanting to prove he could make hits without a "celebrated hit-maker". Bowie chose Derek Bramble, a former bass guitarist for the band Heatwave and more recently a producer for David Grant of the band Linx instead. "I had no idea, he just came searching for me," Bramble later said. As he had done with Rodgers for Let's Dance, Bowie invited Bramble to Mountain Studios in Montreux, Switzerland, to record demos of his new material. Emphasising reggae, a group of local Swiss musicians cut demos. According to biographer Chris O'Leary, musicians present at the Tonight sessions said the demos were "tremendous", describing them as "funky, raw, [and] full of promise".

The engineer of Let's Dance, Bob Clearmountain, was asked to return but was unavailable; he suggested Hugh Padgham, who had worked with XTC, Genesis, Peter Gabriel, and more recently with the Police as a producer. Padgham later admitted to having mixed feelings about working solely as an engineer but accepted Bowie wanted to work this way. Padgham suggested Le Studio in Morin-Heights, Canada, where he had recently completed work with the Police.

Writing and recording

Recording for the new album officially began at Le Studio in May 1984, less than five months after the Serious Moonlight tour. Bowie arrived for the sessions with eight of the nine songs that would appear on the album. This surprised collaborator Carlos Alomar, who said "it was the first time in the eleven years that I've been with the damn man that he's brought in anything". Along with Alomar, most of the personnel from Let's Dance and the tour returned for the record, alongside newcomers Mark Pender, Curtis King and Guy St Onge. Pegg writes Onge's contributions on marimba provide the album with "its most distinctive instrumental identity". The saxophone section, in line with the tour's brochure, was dubbed "the Borneo Horns". Like Let's Dance, but unlike most previous Bowie albums, Bowie played no instruments, and he delegated almost all responsibility for the music played to his musicians, only occasionally offering critical input. He confessed at the time: "I very much left everybody else to it. I just came in with the songs and the ideas and how they should be played and then watched them put it all together. It was great!"

Iggy Pop spent a good deal of time in the studio during the sessions, saying, "I worked extensively on that album. There's a lot more work there than is reflected in just the simple co-writing credit for two songs and some of the old stuff." Discussing the collaboration, Bowie said: "We worked very much the way we did on Lust for Life and The Idiot. I often gave him a few anchor images that I wanted him to play off and he would take them away and start free-associating and I would then put that together in a way I could sing." Their collaborations resulted in "Tumble and Twirl" and "Dancing with the Big Boys", which was written and recorded in eight hours as they egged each other on. In what was described as an "exhilarating rush", Bowie and Pop "went in [to the studio] with a few bottles of beer and would virtually bellow out anything that came into their heads," said Padgham. "And I just recorded it all." According to Padgham, the two wrote many songs that did not make the final record. He described these tracks as "more left-field" and "less poppy".

The album features a guest appearance from singer Tina Turner, who sings a duet with Bowie on the title track. During recording, Bowie and Turner sang face-to-face, although Bowie went back and re-recorded the first verse after deciding to sing his part in a higher octave. Turner had just released her massively successful comeback album Private Dancer earlier that year, which featured a cover of Bowie's "1984". Later in 2004, Turner revealed that Bowie rescued her career when she was dealing with domestic violence. In 1983, Bowie was able to get Turner re-signed with Capitol Records, leading to her comeback.

The sessions were troublesome. Padgham later told biographer David Buckley that Bramble had a habit of asking for "unnecessary retakes". After a vocal take, Bramble would request another, while he and Bowie insisted one was enough; Padgham believed Bramble was not "used to anyone being able to do a vocal in one take". Alomar would later say: "Bramble was a really nice guy, but he didn't know jack-shit about producing." Padgham later revealed in the BBC Radio 2 documentary Golden Years that there was a "falling out" with Bramble towards the end of the sessions, leading to his departure and Padgham taking over as producer. Padgham hated many of the songs, specifically "Blue Jean" and the title track, finding them "too poppy", preferring the "more left-field" compositions that were left off the final album. He later felt regret that he "didn't have the balls" to finish the other songs, telling Buckley: "Who am I to say to Mr. David Bowie that his songs suck?"

Songs
Commentators have characterised Tonight as pop, blue-eyed soul, dance and rock. Furthermore, James E. Perone recognises the presence of reggae, R&B and ska. The record's sound is similar to Let's Dance and the Serious Moonlight tour; Bowie purposefully made it this way because he felt the new fans he had accumulated would expect to hear the same thing on the new album that they had heard before. Of the nine songs on the album, Bowie was the sole writer for only two, "Loving the Alien" and "Blue Jean"; two, "Tumble and Twirl" and "Dancing with the Big Boys", were co-written by Bowie and Iggy Pop, and the remaining five are cover versions, three originally by Pop: "Don't Look Down", "Tonight" and "Neighborhood Threat". One cover was the Beach Boys' 1966 song "God Only Knows", which, according to Pegg, was shortlisted for Bowie's 1973 covers album Pin Ups. Bowie explained: "I think that [Tonight] gave me a chance, like Pin Ups did a few years ago, to do some covers that I always wanted to do." The final cover is the Jerry Leiber and Mike Stoller-penned "I Keep Forgettin'", originally made famous by Chuck Jackson.

Side one
Bowie described "Loving the Alien" as a very personal bit of writing that he did not feel fitted in with the rest of the album because it is such a dark song amidst lighter fare. He said, "Alien' came about because of my feeling that so much history is wrong – as is being rediscovered all the time – and that we base so much on the wrong knowledge that we've gleaned." Alomar thought the song "had to do with Major Tom", a claim Bowie rejected. The lyrics are religion-based and politically charged. While Pegg believes it to be a terrific song, he finds it weighed down by "over-elaborate production". Bowie later admitted that the demo was superior. Bowie's reworking of "Don't Look Down" is influenced by reggae music. He had attempted it in many different ways, including jazz rock, march and ska, but felt none of them worked. O'Leary criticises Bowie's version, finding that it strips the "power" of Pop's original. Buckley on the other hand, finds it "super-cool".

Bowie's rendition of "God Only Knows" incorporates strings and saxophone, while he sings his vocal in a croon. Although Bowie was defensive of his recording in an interview with Charles Shaar Murray in 1984, both Pegg and O'Leary consider Bowie's rendition as "the worst recording he ever made". Buckley equally calls it one of two "nadirs" on the record and a "bathetic interpretation". For the title track, Bowie eliminated Pop's original spoken word introduction, calling it an "idiosyncratic thing of [Pop's] that it seemed not part of my vocabulary." Bowie's rendition, sung as a duet with Tina Turner, is reggae-influenced. Her vocals are placed low in the mix, which O'Leary believes gives her "no entry point". Despite mostly being held in low regard, Kurt Loder of Rolling Stone at the time praised Bowie's version, calling it "one of the most vibrantly beautiful tracks he's ever recorded".

Side two
"Neighborhood Threat" features a heavier guitar sound than Pop's original, although Pegg says that Bowie's version lacks the original's "doom-laden percussion and wall-of-sound atmospherics". It stands out as a track Bowie wished he had not done, with him later calling it "disastrous". "That's one I wish I'd never touched, or at least touched it differently. It went totally wrong. It sounded so tight and compromised, and it was such a gas doing it. It was the wrong band to do it with – wonderful band, but it wasn't quite right for that song." "Blue Jean" has been generally seen as the best song on the album. O'Leary writes it follows the "Let's Dance formula", in that it's an "uptempo throwback" to 1950s and 1960s artists, particularly Eddie Cochran. Later dubbed by Bowie as "sexist rock 'n' roll", Buckley calls it a "fine pop song", albeit "slightly run-of-the-mill by Bowie's standards".

"Tumble and Twirl" recounts Bowie and Pop's exploits while vacationing in the Indonesian islands of Bali and Java after Bowie's previous tour had ended. Bowie felt that lyrically Pop's work stood out the most on the track. Pegg finds its music as reminiscent of world music, which Bowie explored on Lodger (1979). Biographers have criticised the rendition of "I Keep Forgettin"; Buckley called it "unmemorable". At the time, Bowie said, "I always wanted to do that song." "Dancing with the Big Boys" is about the "little guy" being crushed by "oppressive corporate structures". The lyrics were taken from a backlog of unused lyrics. Containing many studio effects, Pegg says it foreshadows what Bowie would explore on Never Let Me Down (1987). Bowie has said it is the "best example" of what he was trying to accomplish on Tonight:

Release

Artwork
Mick Haggerty, who designed the artwork for Let's Dance (and would do the same for Never Let Me Down), did the same for Tonight. It features a blue-painted Bowie with his hair dyed dark brown, against a backdrop of oil-paint "daubs" and flowers. Pegg and Buckley compare it to the works of Gilbert & George. For the design, Bowie asked Haggarty to create "something heroic", pointing to a Vladimir Tretchikoff painting of a blue-skinned Chinese woman for reference. Although Consequence of Sound considers the artwork one of Bowie's "most genuinely beautiful" covers, Buckley states that for the first time, one of Bowie's cover artworks was not innovative, calling it "satirically run-of-the-mill". Paul Du Noyer later said: "If you look at the album covers and the way he's dressed, it looks like a man who has let himself be designed by others rather than reinventing himself, which is what he has proverbially always done."

Singles
"Blue Jean" was released as the lead single on 10September 1984, backed by "Dancing with the Big Boys". It was a commercial success, peaking at number six in the UK and number eight in the US, mostly promoted with an elaborate 21-minute short film directed by Julien Temple. Partly inspired by the video for Michael Jackson's "Thriller", Jazzin' for Blue Jean was shot in August 1984 and features Bowie in dual roles: as Vic, a man with his eye on a girl and as Screaming' Lord Byron, a flamboyant rock star whose forthcoming gig provides the man with a date. Bowie performs "Blue Jean" as Byron towards the end of the film; a shorter music video for "Blue Jean" was shot a few days later. Praised by Pegg for showing off Bowie's comedic talent, Jazzin' for Blue Jean led Bowie and Temple to work together for Absolute Beginners (1986).

EMI America Records released Tonight on 24 September 1984, with the catalogue number EMI America DB 1. Its release came only nine months after the end of the Serious Moonlight tour. Coming off the successes of Let's Dance, the tour and Bowie's appearance in Merry Christmas, Mr. Lawrence, Tonight continued Bowie's run of commercial successes, peaking at number one on the UK Albums Chart. Although not as successful in the US as its predecessor, Tonight peaked at number 11 on the Billboard Top 200 Albums chart.

The title track was released as the second single from the album in November 1984, with "Tumble and Twirl" as the B-side. With no supporting video, the single stalled on the charts, peaking at number 53 in both the UK and the US. A remix of "Loving the Alien" was released as the third and final single in May 1985, with a remix of "Don't Look Down" as the B-side. It stalled on the UK charts at number 19, despite being promoted by a video co-directed by David Mallet. It features Bowie performing on the song on an Escher-like set, at one point appearing in blue similar to the album's cover artwork.

Critical reception

Upon its release, Tonight was greeted with mostly unenthusiastic reactions, although it did receive some positive attention. Murray complimented the record's "dizzying variety of mood and technique" in NME, while Billboard said that "the once and future [Bowie] takes yet another turn, saving more edgy, passionate dance-rock for the second side while throwing the spotlight on surprisingly restrained ballads and mid-tempo rockers, replete with dreamy rhythms and even lush strings courtesy of Arif Mardin". Cash Box was also positive, highlighting a number of strong songs and stating that Bowie "loses none of his unique songwriting and vocal adventurousness" with an album that lies in the "same commercial vein" as Let's Dance. However, other reviewers criticised it for lacking creativity. Ian Birch of Smash Hits felt Tonight lacked direction and referred to it as "an uneasy, bumper-to-bumper mixture of styles". Rolling Stone said, "This album is a throwaway, and David Bowie knows it." Eleanor Levy of Record Mirror additionally called it disappointing by Bowie's standards: a collection of songs—some good, some bad—that do not fit well together. Padgham also said that it was less innovative than other Bowie albums.

Subsequent events and legacy

Almost immediately following its release, Bowie gave few press interviews for Tonight, and appeared almost apologetic. In one interview he said, "Recently I've used an accepted vocabulary, as [Brian] Eno would say...I feel on the whole fairly happy about my state of mind and my physical being and I guess I wanted to put my musical being in a similar staid and healthy area, but I'm not sure that that was a very wise thing to do." He began a series of miscellaneous projects at the end of 1984 which ventured into 1985, starting with collaborating with the Pat Metheny Group on "This Is Not America", for the soundtrack album for The Falcon and the Snowman (1985). He then performed at Live Aid, collaborated with Mick Jagger on "Dancing in the Street" and composed songs for the films Absolute Beginners (1985) and Labyrinth (1986), both of which Bowie starred in.

As well as acknowledging that Tonight was not one of his stronger efforts, Bowie would later distance himself from his 1984–1987 period following the critical dismissal of Never Let Me Down. In 1989, while working with Tin Machine, he described both Tonight and Never Let Me Down as:

In 1993, he said he was indifferent about what he was doing and he "let everyone tell [him] what to do". In a 2016 retrospective ranking all of Bowie's 26 studio albums from worst to best, Bryan Wawzenek of Ultimate Classic Rock placed Tonight at number 24 (above Black Tie White Noise and Never Let Me Down). He called the entire record as a mixed bag except for "Blue Jean". The writers of Consequence of Sound ranked Tonight number 20 in their 2018 list, calling it "a sultry and playful side-step to Let's Dance that shuffles between island influences, balladeering, and horn-heavy rock."

Retrospective appraisal

Retrospectively, Tonight is generally considered to be one of Bowie's weakest releases. An article for Melody Maker later dismissed Tonight as "rotten". AllMusic critic Stephen Thomas Erlewine called it "one of the weakest albums Bowie ever recorded" and wrote that "none of the material equals the songs on Let's Dance", although he made an exception for "Blue Jean". The New Rolling Stone Album Guide described Tonight as "an expensive quickie padded with lame covers". Alexis Petridis of The Guardian wrote in a retrospective of Bowie's career in 2016: "Let’s Dance... had its moments ... Tonight, however, did not". Jeff Giles of Ultimate Classic Rock, when revisiting Tonight and Never Let Me Down said, "[Tonight] was pleasant enough in its way, but lacking the creative spark that fueled his best work – and nothing close to essential."

Despite the general critical consensus on the album, Stylus Magazine reviewed the album in 2005 as part of its "On Second Thought" section and concluded that Tonight, although not a great album, is still a good one: "it's a much better album than you think it is, or may have been led to believe. Bowie's made some subpar records, but this isn't one of them—and frankly, even its failures aren't boring, because, well, it's an '80s Bowie album, from a decade in which he was wildly inconsistent, but also never dull." In 2016, Yo Zushi of the New Statesman defended the album, writing "no album that begins with the seven-minute masterpiece 'Loving the Alien' and contains the rocking 'Blue Jean' should have received the drubbing it got". He also argued "the TV-special-style cover of the Beach Boys' 'God Only Knows' is as stirring, in its cold, almost Brechtian way, as Station to Stations 'Wild Is the Wind' – it's like watching Elvis in [Las] Vegas through a sheet of ice". Reviewing the album's remaster as part of the Loving the Alien (1983–1988) box set, Chris Ingalls of PopMatters felt the record was a "mixed bag", but its "good moments", citing "Loving the Alien" and "Blue Jean", are "very good indeed".

Like Bowie, his biographers have generally viewed Tonight very unfavourably. While Christopher Sandford calls it one of Bowie's "poorest" albums and "[his] first serious studio misfire since the days of 'The Laughing Gnome'," O'Leary views it in utter disdain: "an immaculately rancid scrap-bag in which a hit single was stuffed into a pile of covers". He considered it "among the least-loved [number one] records of its era". Buckley calls Tonight "the nearest thing Bowie had come across to an artistic disaster," while Paul Trynka says that with Tonight, Bowie's sense of "risk" and randomness "ebbed away". Perone finds the album inconsistent, giving a vibe that it is a mere collection of individual songs rather than a cohesive album. Furthermore, the non-groundbreaking music results in a record that stands below Bowie's better works. Pegg finds that despite its flaws, Tonight is a "more interesting and rewarding" record than its predecessor. He considers Bowie's reggae renditions of "Don't Look Down" and the title track "surprisingly successful", and the two Bowie-penned tracks as having strong songwriting. He concludes that it was the first Bowie album that was "manifestly behind its time". In his book The Man Who Sold the World: David Bowie and the 1970s, author Peter Doggett describes Tonight as "bereft of inspiration", although he praised "Loving the Alien".

Reissues
In 1995, Virgin Records re-released the album on CD with three bonus tracks, all of them singles from soundtracks Bowie contributed to in the years immediately following the album's release. EMI re-released the album in 1999 (featuring 24-bit digitally remastered sound and no bonus tracks).

In 2018, Tonight was remastered for the Loving the Alien (1983–1988) box set released by Parlophone, with other discs in the set including remixes and b-sides from the album. The album was released in CD and vinyl formats, as part of this compilation and then separately the following year.

Track listing

Personnel
Adapted from the Tonight liner notes.

David Bowie – vocals
Derek Bramble – guitar; guitar synthesiser; bass guitar; synthesiser; backing vocals
Carlos Alomar – guitars
Omar Hakim – drums
Carmine Rojas – bass guitar
Mark King – bass guitar 
Rob Yale – Fairlight CMI 
Guy St. Onge – marimba
Sammy Figueroa – percussion
Tina Turner – lead vocals 
Iggy Pop – backing vocals 
Robin Clark – backing vocals
George Simms – backing vocals
Curtis King – backing vocals
Arif Mardin – string arrangements; synthesisers
Mark Pender – flugel horn; trumpet

The Borneo Horns
Stanley Harrison – alto saxophone; tenor saxophone
Lenny Pickett – tenor saxophone; clarinet
Steve Elson – baritone saxophone

Production
David Bowie – producer
Derek Bramble – producer
Hugh Padgham – producer, engineer and mixer

Charts and certifications

Weekly charts

Year-end charts

Certifications

References

Sources

External links

1984 albums
David Bowie albums
EMI America Records albums
EMI Records albums
Parlophone albums
Virgin Records albums
Albums arranged by Arif Mardin
Albums produced by David Bowie
Albums produced by Hugh Padgham
Albums recorded at Le Studio
Blue-eyed soul albums
Soul albums by English artists